Clara Marina Brugada Molina (born August 12, 1963) is a Mexican politician, member of the National Regeneration Movement Party. She is currently serving as Chief of the Office of the Iztapalapa borough in Mexico City.

References

1963 births
Living people
Metropolitan Autonomous University alumni
Members of the Chamber of Deputies (Mexico)
Women members of the Chamber of Deputies (Mexico)
Members of the Constituent Assembly of Mexico City